As Far As I Can See is the fourth studio album by the British rock band the Zombies, and their first since 1991. The lineup includes three of the band's original members: Rod Argent, Colin Blunstone and Chris White, with fourth original member Paul Atkinson also serving as A&R for the record.

Critical reception

As Far As I Can See was met with negative response from critics.

Track listing

Personnel
The Zombies
Colin Blunstone - vocals
Rod Argent - keyboards, backing and lead vocals
Keith Airey - lead guitar, backing vocals
Jim Rodford - bass, backing vocals
Steve Rodford - drums
Chris White - backing vocals
Mark Johns - rhythm guitar
Technical
Steve Orchard - engineer, mixing
Andrew Powell - conductor
Nick Robbins - mastering
Phil Smee - design, photography
Gavyn Wright - leader
Paul Atkinson - A&R
Chris Cook, Keith Curtis - photography

References

2004 albums
The Zombies albums
Albums produced by Rod Argent
Rhino Records albums